Nuclear factor NF-kappa-B p105 subunit is a protein that in humans is encoded by the NFKB1 gene.

This gene encodes a 105 kD protein which can undergo cotranslational processing by the 26S proteasome to produce a 50 kD protein. The 105 kD protein is a Rel protein-specific transcription inhibitor and the 50 kD protein is a DNA binding subunit of the NF-kappaB (NF-κB) protein complex. NF-κB is a transcription factor that is activated by various intra- and extra-cellular stimuli such as cytokines, oxidant-free radicals, ultraviolet irradiation, and bacterial or viral products. Activated NF-κB translocates into the nucleus and stimulates the expression of genes involved in a wide variety of biological functions; over 200 known genes are targets of NF-κB in various cell types, under specific conditions. Inappropriate activation of NF-κB has been associated with a number of inflammatory diseases while persistent inhibition of NF-κB leads to inappropriate immune cell development or delayed cell growth.

Model organisms

Model organisms have been used in the study of NFKB1 function. A conditional knockout mouse line, called Nfkb1tm1a(KOMP)Wtsi was generated as part of the International Knockout Mouse Consortium program — a high-throughput mutagenesis project to generate and distribute animal models of disease to interested scientists.

Male and female animals underwent a standardized phenotypic screen to determine the effects of deletion. Twenty five tests were carried out on mutant mice and six significant abnormalities were observed. Female homozygotes had a decreased respiratory quotient, increased circulating alkaline phosphatase level and increased leukocyte cell number. Male homozygotes showed an increased susceptibility to Salmonella infection, while homozygotes of both sex had decreased IgG1 and decreased regulatory T cell and NK cell numbers.

Interactions 

NFKB1 has been shown to interact with:

 BCL3, 
 C22orf25,
 HDAC1, 
 HMGA2 
 IKK2, 
 ITGB3BP, 
 IκBα, 
 LYL1, 
 MAP3K7IP2, 
 MAP3K8, 
 MEN1, 
 NFKB2, 
 NFKBIE, 
 NOTCH1, 
 Nuclear receptor coactivator 1, 
 RELA, 
 RELB, 
 STAT3, 
 STAT6,  and
 TSC22D3.

References

Further reading

External links 
 
 

Transcription factors
Genes mutated in mice